Tânia Regina Spindler de Oliveira (born April 10, 1977 in Palotina, Paraná) is a female Brazilian race walker. She set both a personal best and a national record-breaking time of 1:33:23 by finishing twenty-third at the 2008 IAAF World Race Walking Cup in Cheboksary, Russia. She also claimed the nation's first ever title for the women's 20 km event at the 2009 Pan American Race Walking Cup in San Salvador, El Salvador, with a time of 1:38:53.

Spindler represented Brazil at the 2008 Summer Olympics in Beijing, where she competed for the women's 20 km race walk. Despite of the tumultuous weather, she finished the race in thirty-seventh place by twenty seconds behind Ecuador's Johana Ordóñez, outside her personal best of 1:36:26.

Spindler is a full-time member of Clube de Atletismo BM&F in São Paulo, being coached and trained by her husband Irineu de Oliveira.

References

External links

Profile – UOL Esporte 
Profile – Clube de Atletismo BM&F 
NBC 2008 Olympics profile

Brazilian female racewalkers
Living people
Olympic athletes of Brazil
Athletes (track and field) at the 2008 Summer Olympics
Sportspeople from Paraná (state)
1977 births
21st-century Brazilian women